Caroline Boujard (born 1 January 1994) is a French rugby union player. She played for France in the 2021 Women's Six Nations Championship, scoring a hat-trick in the opening match.

References

1994 births
Living people
Female rugby union players
French female rugby union players
Sportspeople from Saint-Cloud